Englewood Dam was constructed as a Works Progress Administration project in 1936.

It was purchased by the Urban Drainage and Flood Control District in 1973 who carried out improvements on it until 1975. The dam is located in the Willow Spring Open Space in Centennial, Colorado which is part of the South Suburban Park and Recreation District.

References

Dams in Colorado
Earth-filled dams
Buildings and structures in Arapahoe County, Colorado
Dams completed in 1936
1936 establishments in Colorado